This is a list of notable organizations related to beer:

 American Homebrewers Association (AHA)
 Australian International Beer Awards
 Beer Judge Certification Program (BJCP)
 Brewers Association (BA)
 Brewers of Europe
 Campaign for Real Ale (CAMRA)
 Deutscher Brauer-Bund (DBB)
 European Beer Consumers Union (EBCU)
 European Brewery Convention
 Great Australasian Beer SpecTAPular
 HORAL
 Independent Family Brewers of Britain (IFBB)
 Institute of Brewing and Distilling
 Society for the Preservation of Beers from the Wood (SPBW)
 Society of Independent Brewers (SIBA)
 Workers Beer Company (WBC)
 World Series of Beer Pong (WSOBP)

See also

References

 
Beer